Academy Plastic Model Co., Ltd. (Hangul:아카데미과학주식회사) is a Korean plastic model, chemical, and toy company. It is headquartered in Uijeongbu-Si, Gyeonggi-do, Korea and was established on September 1, 1969. It holds three headquarters: in Seoul, Korea; Gelsenkirchen, Germany; and Rosario, Cavite, Philippines. Academy has developed and supplied over 500 products to more than 60 countries worldwide, and since 1989, Academy has won several Modell des Jahres awards for its product quality. Academy manufacturers plastic model kits, radio controlled cars, battery- and solar-powered educational models, sailboat models, acrylic and enamel model paints, airsoft guns, and various modelling tools and supplies.

Product Lines

Aircraft model kits
Academy produces predominantly aircraft model kits in the 1:72 and 1:48 scales.

Military Miniatures (1/35 scale)
The oldest category in Academy's export line has been the "Military Miniatures" series of 1:35 scale figures and vehicles. The series has focused on World War II military subjects though a growing minority of kits in this line come from later periods. The products are characterized by striking full color paintings on the boxtops, though instructions are generally brief and sometimes poorly translated from original Korean. Academy molds are generally very clean and no flashing is found on their products.

In terms of quality, Academy armor model kits have been reviewed less favorably than competitors such as Tamiya Corporation with some of their kits having accuracy issues. Their recent M3 Lee tank model was criticized in reviews for having incorrect shapes and too-tall suspension units. Their M3 Stuart series were criticized for inaccurate interiors, although Academy is the only company to offer Stuart kits with interior detail on the market.

Radio-controlled trucks and trailers (1/14 scale) 

Academy also produces 1/14 scale radio controlled trucks using ABS body shells instead of the alloy and sheet metal that competitor Wedico uses on its 1/16 scale truck line.

The worldwide division/importer also released a semi-low loader trailer in this scale.(Brand name: Carisma)

GT14 (electric 4wd Car)

M14 (electric 2wd Car)

R14 (electric 4wd Car)

Radio-controlled tanks (1/25 scale) 
Academy's radio controlled tanks have options such as sound, light and optional parts to depict different variants.

The Leopard A4 and Flakpanzer Gepard are no longer produced; updated versions of the others have some technical and cosmetic innovations over the original models.
The latest models have full sound function, fire simulation (barrel moves when fired), and even a barrel stabiliser.
Also there is a battle function unit for sale, so you can actually fight a tank battle with other similar equipped tanks from Academy.

Radio Controlled Racing Cars
There is also a small lineup of 1/10 scale radio controlled racing cars, such as
 SB-Sport (4wd electric buggy-launched back)
 SB-V2 (4wd electric buggy)
 SB-V2 Pro (4wd competition electric buggy)
 Wyvern (4wd electric buggy, entry level-launched back)
 Griffin (2wd electric buggy, entry level-launched back)
 STR-4 beta (touring car-launched back)
 STR-4 pro 2 (4wd electric touring car, high level)
 GV2 (2wd electric buggy, high level)
 GV2-T (2wd electric buggy, high level)
 GV2 RTR (2wd electric buggy, entry level)
 STR-4 Pro 2 (4wd electric touring, High level)
 SP3-XT (2wd electric touring, High level)
 RT4 GP (4wd GP truck, entry level)
 velox XT (4wd GP touring, entry level)
 velox XB (4WD GP Buggy, entry level)
 velox xt pro (4wd GP touring, high level)
 RT4 GP pro (4wd GP truck, high level) 
 SB-V3 (4wd competition electric buggy)
and various other rather toy grade vehicles.

Track racing cars
The Mini 4WD series, which are small, single-motor, free-operating electric models designed to run in competition on a special, deeply channeled track.

Static-display scale models
Static-display scale models include the following:
Cars, albeit a fairly limited line focused on 1980s Korean cars current at the time they were kitted along with the occasional modern Korean car - a Hyundai Grandeur (Azera) was released in 2016 and a Santa Fe announced in 2020.
Ships, such as the Titanic
Miniature figures
Airplanes

Airsoft guns
Academy makes Airsoft guns. Airsoft guns are low powered replica weapons that shoot 6 mm plastic BBs at moderate velocities.
In 1992, they made the first "clone" AEG, or automatic electric gun. They referred to the Marui Famas gearbox, and made the Academy L85. It is upgradable just like the Marui Famas, and is considered a very skirmishable gun once upgraded.
Academy also makes many other AEGs. They make an XM177, MP5 series, and recently have made an M16A1 (VN style), and an M4. Also, they recently came out with a DPMS "kitty kat" gun, this gun performs in the same way as a Marui boys gun.
Their springer line is quite popular. Cybergun currently imports the XM177 and other M16 variants under the DPMS A15 line. They come preupgraded from the factory presumably, as Korean airsoft power laws say that all guns must be under  with .12s (it isn't strictly enforced). Their XM177 and probably many of their other guns are copies of Tokyo Marui. Their M4 and Kitty Kat springers are based on their AEG M4s, and can take a V2 gearbox with very little modification.
Academy makes a few airsoft kits, which are assembled by the purchaser. Kit offerings include an Uzi, a few M16 variants, including an M16A1 with M203. They also make S&W M29 revolver kits. None of these kit guns are good skirmish guns, but they are good "wallhangers."
Academy airsoft guns, and presumably their model kits are also made in the Philippines. In the past (and recently to an extent) airsoft was basically illegal there. However, guns apparently leak from the Academy plant in the Philippines and are sold at places where airsoft is retailed. Many of the Academy airsoft guns imported by Cybergun were made in the Philippines.

Mobile Suit Gundam Kandam

Mobile Suit Gundam Kandam (Hangul:기동전사 건담) is clone of Gunpla

See also
Mini 4WD
Model car
Model military vehicle

References

Toy companies established in 1969
South Korean companies established in 1969
Model manufacturers of South Korea
Radio-controlled car manufacturers
Toy brands
Toy companies of South Korea
South Korean brands